The Canada national women's rugby league team, also known as the Canadian Ravens represents Canada in international rugby league football tournaments. Canada have qualified for, and will be competing in the 2021 Women's Rugby League World Cup (to be held in November 2022 following a delay due to the Covid-19 pandemic) and the 2025 Women's Rugby League World Cup. Canada previously competed in the 2017 Women's Rugby League World Cup.

Current squad
The following players were selected in the Ravens' World Cup Squad. The team will be coached by Mike Castle. 
Tallies in the table include the Round 3 match against Brazil. 

Support Staff for the tournament are
 Coach: Mike Castle.
 Assistant coaches: Ben Hickey, Stevi Schnoor, Darryl Fisher.
 Team Manager: Katie Grudzinski
Notes:
 Laura Mariu played for New Zealand Kiwi Ferns from 2000 to 2018 including all five previous World Cups. Mariu qualifies to play for Canada through her mother. Kiwi Ferns records are incomplete for the period from 2002 to 2010, with full line-ups known for only 8 of 18 matches. Mariu's record from known appearances is at least 24 caps, with nine tries and 25 goals, including 10 goals in a match, against the Pacific Islands in the 2008 World Cup.

Results

Full internationals

Warm-Up Matches

Nines

Past squads

2017 World Cup 

Squad to the 2017 Women's Rugby League World Cup: Maira Acevedo (British Columbia), Gillian Boag (British Columbia), Nina Bui (Ontario), Andrea Burk (British Columbia), Christina Burnham (British Columbia), Mackenzie Fane (Ontario), Kathleen Grudzinski (British Columbia), Janai Haupapa (Alberta), Michelle Helmeczi (Alberta), Natalie King (British Columbia), Kelcey Leavitt (Alberta), Mandy Marchak (British Columbia), Sabrina McDaid (Ontario),  Wealtha Jade Menin Naglis (Alberta), Fedelia Omoghan (Ontario), Megan Pakulis (Ontario), Irene Patrinos (Ontario), Stevi Schnoor (British Columbia), Natasha Smith (British Columbia), Elizabeth Steele (Alberta), Natalie Tam (Ontario), Tiera Thomas-Reynolds (Ontario), Barbara Waddell (Forrestville Ferrets), and Petra Woods (Ontario).
The team was coached by Mike Castle.

Tour of Serbia 
The following players participated in the two Test Match tour of Serbia in September 2019: Chantalle Bracken (Jersey number 11), Tanya Dordevic (12), Brittany Douglas (16), Sarah Duncan (6), MacKenzie Fane (13) (Captain), Jennifer Garford (10), Simran Gillar (17), Megean Gosselin (3), Gabrielle Hindley (15), Hailey Karoum (9), Krista Kent (8), Sabrina McDaid (2), Lea Milošević (4), Natasha Naismith (7), Kaila Pickering (1), Melissa Šešelja (5), and Ben Skinner (14). 
The team was coached by Ben Fleming.

United States in April 2022 
The following players participated in the Ravens' Test Match on Saturday, 16 April 2022. 
Alanna Fittes, Brittany Jones, Ferris Sandboe, Candace Scholten, Petra Woods, Natasha Naismith, Sabrina McDaid, Kristy Sargent, Natalie Tam, Elizabeth Steele, Gabrielle Hindley, Sarah Maguire, Megan Pakulis, Christina Burnham, Ada Okonkwo, Demi Swann, and Zoey Siciliano.  The team was coached by Mike Castle. 
The following players participated in a development, or "Select" team match that was held on 16 April, 2022, prior to the Test Match. 
Ashley Holt, Miriama Naibosali, Megan Buchanan, Savannah Bacchas, Brittany Douglas, Steph Hovdestad, Krista Kent, Alix Evans, Tamisha Toussaint, Maddy Aberg, Valerie Wideski, and Katie Grudzinski. There were four players that played in both the "Select" match and the Test match, namely: Brittany Jones, Zoey Siciliano, Demi Swann and Christina Burnham.

See also

Toronto Wolfpack
Rugby league in Canada

References

External links

Women's national rugby league teams
Rugby league
Rugby league in Canada
Canadian rugby league teams